The 158th Massachusetts General Court, consisting of the Massachusetts Senate and the Massachusetts House of Representatives, met in 1953 and 1954 during the governorship of Christian Herter. Richard I. Furbush served as president of the Senate and Charles Gibbons served as speaker of the House.

Senators

Representatives

See also
 1954 Massachusetts gubernatorial election
 83rd United States Congress
 List of Massachusetts General Courts

References

Further reading

External links

 
 
 
 

Political history of Massachusetts
Massachusetts legislative sessions
massachusetts
1953 in Massachusetts
massachusetts
1954 in Massachusetts